Ansar Allah or Ansarullah is the Arabic for "Helpers/Supporters of God". It may refer to: 
the Houthi movement in Yemen
Ansarullah (Ahmadiyya), an Ahmadiyya auxiliary organisation
Ansaaru Allah or Nuwaubian Nation, an alternative name of an "Egyptian themed" black nationalist group
Jund Ansar Allah, an armed Islamist organization operating in the Gaza Strip.

See also
Ansar (Islam), historically the "helpers" in Medina who accommodated the early Muslim migrants (including Muhammad) who fled persecution in Mecca 
Ansar (military)
Ansari (nisbat)
Ansar (disambiguation)
Ansari (disambiguation)